Brutus Condemning His Sons to Death is a 1788 painting by the Guadeloupe born French Neoclassical painter Guillaume Guillon-Lethière (1760–1832). It depicts the legendary founder of the Roman Republic Junius Brutus who overthrew Lucius Tarquinius Superbus the last King of Rome, watching the execution of his sons Tiberius Junius Brutus and Titus Junius Brutus stoically after having sentenced them to die for plotting to restore the Tarquin monarchy.

The work was extremely controversial due to the severed head of one of Junius Brutus' sons, presaging the political and revolutionary violence which soon occurred in France.

In 2018 the Clark Art Institute in Williamstown, Massachusetts acquired the painting as well as a preparatory drawing for it from a private collection where it had been for many years.

This work is the first of two Guillon-Lethière created with this subject and title. The second work was executed later in 1811 and is in the permanent collection of the Louvre in Paris.

Lethiere's more famous contemporary Jacques Louis David covered the same historical subject in his work The Lictors Bring to Brutus the Bodies of His Sons (1789).

References

1788 paintings
Paintings by Guillaume Guillon-Lethière
History paintings